Orthochromis stormsi is a species of cichlid endemic to the Democratic Republic of the Congo, where it is known from the upper Congo River basin and Lake Mweru.  It has also been reported from Pool Malebo (Stanley Pool) and the Regina Falls in the lower Congo River basin, but the identity of these populations requires further investigation. This species can reach a length of  SL. The specific name honors the Belgian Army Lieutenant Maurice Joseph Auguste Marie Raphael Storms (1875-1941) who collected the type which he presented to the Brussels Museum.

References

External links 

Fish of the Democratic Republic of the Congo
stormsi
Taxa named by George Albert Boulenger
Fish described in 1902